Daniel Gordon may refer to:
 Daniel Gordon (film director), British documentary film director
 Daniel Gordon (artist) (born 1980), American artist
 Daniel Gordon (footballer) (born 1985), Jamaican-German football (soccer) player
 Daniel Gordon (politician) (1821–1907), Canadian ship owner and politician
 Daniel P. Gordon (1969–2017), American politician and construction contractor

See also
 Dan Gordon (disambiguation)